Obed Saúl Martínez Villarreal (born 30 March 1996) is a professional Mexican footballer who currently plays for Correcaminos UAT as a midfielder. He made his professional debut with FC Juárez during a Copa MX victory over Veracruz on 19 July 2016. He played with Atlético Veracruz of the Liga de Balompié Mexicano during the league's inaugural season, leading them to a runners-up finish after losing to Chapulineros de Oaxaca in the finals.

References

1996 births
Living people
Mexican expatriate footballers
Association football midfielders
C.F. Monterrey players
FC Juárez footballers
CD Toledo players
Correcaminos UAT footballers
Ascenso MX players
Liga Premier de México players
Tercera División de México players
Segunda División B players
Tercera División players
Mexican expatriate sportspeople in Spain
Expatriate footballers in Spain
Footballers from Nuevo León
Sportspeople from Monterrey
Liga de Balompié Mexicano players
Mexican footballers